The Hartley TS16 (Trailer Sailer 16 foot) is an Australian trailerable sailboat that was designed in 1956 by New Zealander Richard Hartley as a day sailer and which later became a one design racer.

The design was based on a traditional New Zealand mullet fishing boat and was the first trailer sailer sailboat design built. Hartley later designed the TS18 and TS21.

Production
Most boats completed have been built by amateur builders using hand tools in residential garages and constructed of wood. Construction time is estimated at 400 hours. Later, some were commercially manufactured of fibreglass over a foam core. The boat was actually designed to fit into a garage. Construction plans are supplied by Hartley Boat Plans of Australia. About 1,800 boats have been completed.

Design
The Hartley TS16 is a recreational keelboat, built predominantly of wood, or of fibreglass over a foam core, with wood trim. It has a fractional sloop rig, originally with wooden spars and later with aluminum. The hill has a slightly raked stem, a near-vertical transom, a transom-hung rudder controlled by a tiller and a centreboard. It displaces .

Operational history
A 2001 review in Australian Sailing described the design: "the boat that started the trailer-sailer  movement, the Hartley 16 designed by New Zealander Richard Hartley in the early 1950s, still has good  support and a very active class association in Australia. Hartley designed the boat for ease of construction in plywood with only hand tools by the  home  handyman. Although  boats have been built professionally in fibreglass foam/sandwich, the most  common way of getting on the water in a new boat is to build it in timber from the official plans..."

See also
List of sailing boat types

References

External links

1950s sailboat type designs
Sailing yachts
Sailing yachts of Australia
Trailer sailers
Sailboat type designs by Richard Hartley